The President of Co-operative Congress has been a prominent position in the British co-operative movement. Co-operative Congress is the national conference for the movement.

Beginning with the first modern Congress in 1869, a Congress President was elected to preside over the event: to begin with, a President was elected for each day of Congress, but from 1896 a single President was elected for the whole event. Being president was considered the highest honour in the UK Co-operative Movement, with societies nominating individuals for the position in recognition of their contribution to the movement. The President was presented with a commemorative medal, and gave a keynote address to the conference.

The Congress voted to abolish the position of President in 2007, with Alan Gill (former Chief Executive of Leeds Co-operative Society) being the last to serve in the position.

Congress presidents (1869-1895)

Congress presidents (1896-1944)

Congress presidents (1945-2007)

References